"See-Saw" is a song from Pink Floyd's 1968 album A Saucerful of Secrets.

Composition 
It is the third Pink Floyd song written solely by Richard Wright, the second on the album as such, and features Wright on lead vocals and piano, Farfisa organ, xylophone and Mellotron. On the recording sheet, the song is listed as "The Most Boring Song I've Ever Heard Bar Two". It was recorded on the 25 and 26 January 1968 at EMI Studios. David Gilmour uses a wah-wah pedal on his electric guitar and possibly contributes backing vocals.

Lyrics 
It's theorized that the song tells of a strangely troubled brother-sister relationship; the loss of a child, the sister killing the brother, from the lyrics of "Sits on a stick in the river, sister's throwing stones, hoping for a hit, he doesn't know, so then, she goes up, while he goes down;" Or simply the loss of childhood, similar to the previous song on the album "Remember a Day," which was also written and sung by Wright.

Reception 
In a review for A Saucerful of Secrets, Jim Miller of Rolling Stone described "See-Saw" as "a ballad scored vocally in a style incongruously reminiscent of Ronny and the Daytonas."

Personnel 
 Richard Wright – lead vocals, Farfisa organ, piano, Mellotron, xylophone
 David Gilmour – acoustic guitar, wah-wah electric guitar and backing vocals
 Roger Waters – bass guitar
 Nick Mason – drums, percussion
 Norman Smith – backing vocals

References

External links 
 

1968 songs
Pink Floyd songs
Psychedelic pop songs
Songs written by Richard Wright (musician)